'''Hon. Gabriel Gathuka Kagombe ''' is a Kenyan politician from the United Democratic Alliance. In the 2022 Kenyan general election, he was elected to succeed Moses Kuria as MP for the Gatundu South Constituency.

See also 
 13th Parliament of Kenya

References 

Living people
Year of birth missing (living people)
People from Kiambu County
Members of the 13th Parliament of Kenya
United Democratic Alliance (Kenya) politicians
21st-century Kenyan politicians